Events from the year 1769 in Scotland.

Incumbents

Law officers 
 Lord Advocate – James Montgomery
 Solicitor General for Scotland – Henry Dundas

Judiciary 
 Lord President of the Court of Session – Lord Arniston, the younger
 Lord Justice General – Duke of Queensberry
 Lord Justice Clerk – Lord Barskimming

Events 
 29 April – James Watt is granted a British patent for "A method of lessening the consumption of steam in steam engines" – the separate condenser, a key improvement (first devised by Watt in 1765 in Glasgow) which stimulates the Industrial Revolution. In September he completes a full-size experimental engine at Kinneil House.
 July 17 – Welsh naturalist Thomas Pennant, having left Chester on 26 June, travels from Bamburgh to Dunbar to begin his tour of Scotland.
 3 August – part of the first North Bridge, Edinburgh, collapses while nearing completion, killing five.
 25 October – Murder of Alexander Montgomerie at Ardrossan.
 9 November – first Co-operative Society in Britain founded by weavers at Fenwick, East Ayrshire.
 John Maxwell (of Dargavel) begins to practice as a lawyer in Glasgow, origin of McGrigors which continues as an independent firm until 2012.
 Ayr Bank opens.
 Fort George completed.

Births 
 2 May – John Malcolm, soldier, statesman and historian (died 1833 in London)
 14 April – Sir William Rae, 3rd Baronet, politician and lawyer (died 1842)
 Charles Ewart, soldier (died 1846 in England)
 Robert Hetrick, poet and blacksmith (died 1849)

Deaths 
 25 October – Alexander Montgomerie, 10th Earl of Eglinton (born 1723; murdered)

The arts
 9 December – first Theatre Royal, Edinburgh, opens.
 Richard Hurd's Ancient and Modern Scots Songs published.

References 

 
Years of the 18th century in Scotland
Scotland
1760s in Scotland